Robert Orford (died 1310) was a medieval Bishop of Ely.

Orford was elected to Ely on 14 April 1302 and consecrated on 28 October 1302. He died on 21 January 1310.

Citations

References

 

Bishops of Ely

13th-century births
1310 deaths
Year of birth unknown